Ricky Alvin Williams (born September 24, 1952) is an American politician currently serving as a member of the Georgia Senate since 2023. Williams previously served as a Republican member of the Georgia House of Representatives from 2017 to 2023.

Education 
Williams attended Gupton-Jones College of Funeral Service.

Career 
Williams was a former co-owner of a funeral home and cemetery.

On November 8, 2016, Williams won an election to become a member of the Georgia House of Representatives for District 145. William defeated St. Sen. Floyd Griffin with 56.57% of the votes. He succeeded Independent Rusty Kidd. Williams took office on January 9, 2017. District 145 covers all of Baldwin County, and a significant portion of Putnam County.

On November 6, 2018, as an incumbent, Williams won re-election unopposed and continued serving District 145. On November 3, 2020, as an incumbent, Williams won his third term, defeating Quentin Howell with 56.16% of the vote.

In December 2021, Williams announced he would run for the Georgia State Senate District 25 seat to replace Burt Jones who ran for Lieutenant Governor of Georgia.

Personal life 
Williams' wife is Donna Williams. They have three children.

References

External links 
 Ricky Williams at ballotpedia.org
 Ricky A. Williams at ourcampaigns.com

Republican Party members of the Georgia House of Representatives
Living people
21st-century American politicians
1952 births